Norbu is a Tibetan name meaning "jewel". It may refer to:
 Norbu Peak, a 17,155 ft.-high dome-shaped mountain in Manali, Himachal Pradesh, India
 Khyentse Norbu, a lama from Bhutan
 Norbulingka, a palace in Lhasa, Tibet
 Chogyal Namkhai Norbu, a Dzogchen teacher
 Gyaincain Norbu, the eleventh Panchen Lama, according to some sources
 Pema Norbu Rinpoche, the eleventh throne holder of the Buddhist Palyul lineage
 Thubten Jigme Norbu, elder brother of the fourteenth Dalai Lama
 Jamyang Norbu, a Tibetan exile political activist
 Thinley Norbu, a Nyingmapa lama
 Tsewang Norbu, a Tibetan singer
 Katok Tsewang Norbu, a Nyingmapa lama
 Gungsangnorbu, a Chinese politician
 Gyaincain Norbu, chairman of the Tibet Autonomous Region from 1990 to 1998
 Wangdi Norbu, a former Bhutanese finance minister

Norbu may also refer to Norbu, a natural sweetener/sugar substitute derived from monkfruit (Siraitia grosvenorii), available in Australia since 2013.